Pango Green Bird FC is a Vanuatu football team based in Port Vila.

Achievements
None

References

Facebook page - https://web.facebook.com/pages/Pango-Green-Bird-Football-Club/186041158432288

Football clubs in Vanuatu
Port Vila